Long-chain fatty acid transport protein 1 (FATP1) is a protein that in humans is encoded by the SLC27A1 gene.

Structure 

The SLC27A1 gene is located on the 19th chromosome, with its specific location being 19p13.11. The gene contains 15 exons. SLC27A1 encodes a 71.1 kDa protein that is composed of 646 amino acids; 26 peptides have been observed through mass spectrometry data.

See also 
 
 Solute carrier family

References

Further reading 

 
 
 
 
 
 

Solute carrier family